Padlet (formerly Wallwisher) is an educational technology startup company based in San Francisco, California and Singapore. Padlet provides a cloud-based software-as-a-service, hosting a real-time collaborative web platform in which users can upload, organize, and share content to virtual bulletin boards called "padlets".

History

Originally named Wallwisher, the company was started in 2008 by Nitesh Goel and Pranav Piyush, two friends from India, and was incorporated in 2012 with funding from the startup accelerator Start-Up Chile. In 2013, Padlet was additionally backed by accelerators Y Combinator and ImagineK12. As of November 2020, the company has raised over $13 million across three Series A rounds of funding.

In 2018, the company drew criticism for its abrupt switch from a free service to a paid pricing model.

During the COVID-19 pandemic, Padlet saw an increase in users, attributed to its use by educators and students following a rise in remote learning worldwide.
In 2021, the platform adopted stronger content moderation practices in response to multiple cases of offensive content - including racist, anti-semitic, and pornographic material - being published on student Padlet accounts.

Use
As of April 2021, Padlet ranks within the top 150 sites on the internet worldwide and sees over 3.25 million estimated daily visitors on its sites. Padlet has emphasized the importance of accessibility, intuitiveness, and collaboration in the design of its interface.

Padlet is widely used among teachers; its use as a pedagogical tool has been studied in various academic journals and conferences including the Association for Computing Machinery Conference on Education Technology and Computers, and the IEEE International Conference of Educational Innovation through Technology.

References

External links 
 Official website

Educational software companies
Education companies established in 2012
Educational technology companies of the United States
Companies based in San Francisco
Technology companies of Singapore